Carabus venustus, is a species of ground beetle in the large genus Carabus.

References 

venustus
Insects described in 1862